Marko Radulović (15 December 1866 – 2 November 1932) was Montenegrin politician and the third Head of Government of Principality of Montenegro from 24 November 1906 to 1 February 1907.

Biography
Radulović was one of the founders of People's Party, the first political party in Montenegro in 1906. Following the 1906 parliamentary elections, the People's Party formed the first party-led government in Montenegrin history with Radulović as Prime Minister. In February 1907, People's Party leader Andrija Radović replaced Radulovic as the head of the government.

Positions held

References

1866 births
1932 deaths
Prime Ministers of Montenegro